The Rio Grande (Panama) is a river in Coclé Province in Panama.

See also
 
 List of rivers of Panama
 List of rivers of the Americas by coastline

References

 Rand McNally, The New International Atlas, 1993.
CIA map, 1995.

Rivers of Panama
Gulf of Panama
Coclé Province
Drainage basins of the Pacific Ocean
Panamanian coasts of the Pacific Ocean